Bernard John Dwyer (born 20 April 1967) is a former professional rugby league footballer who played in the 1980s and 1990s. He played for the St Helens and the Bradford Bulls during a successful rugby league career - he enjoyed the distinction of winning every club honour in the English game.

Dwyer main strengths were viewed as his professional conduct and work rate. His commitment was regarded by observers as exemplary, and this was reflected in his testimonial year at St. Helens where 'the perpetual motion man' was recognised for his work rate. He retired from the sport in 2000.

Bernard Dwyer played , and scored 2-conversions in St. Helens' 4-5 defeat by Wigan in the 1992 Lancashire County Cup Final during the 1992–93 season at Knowsley Road, St. Helens on Sunday 18 October 1992.

In 1995, Dwyer was part of the package that brought Paul Newlove to St. Helens from Bradford Bulls. The deal was a good example of an agreement which suited both parties. Bradford Bulls acquired three solid St. Helens players as well as a quarter of a million pounds. This allowed them to build towards the success they would later enjoy. St. Helens in return acquired the world class  that was to facilitate their drive to return the glory days back to the club.

Dwyer played for Bradford Bulls at hooker in their 1996 Challenge Cup Final defeat by St. Helens.

Bernard is married to wife Jackie and has two children, the oldest Kelly lives in Sydney, whilst the youngest Connor plays Rugby League for Widnes.

References

External links
Saints Heritage Society
(archived by web.archive.org) Stalwart Dwyer To Retire
(archived by web.archive.org) Bull Masters - Bernard Dwyer

1967 births
Living people
Bradford Bulls players
English rugby league players
Great Britain national rugby league team players
Manly Warringah Sea Eagles players
Rugby league players from St Helens, Merseyside
Rugby league second-rows
St Helens R.F.C. players
Ireland national rugby league team players